Larry Mitchell (born June 2, 1967) is a German-born Canadian professional ice hockey coach and a former professional ice hockey player. He has been serving as sporting director of ERC Ingolstadt in the German top-flight Deutsche Eishockey Liga (DEL) since March 2017.

Playing career 
Mitchell spent his early career in his native Canada, playing for the Brockville Braves in the CJAHL, followed by a stint with OHL’s Cornwall Royals.

In 1988, he signed his first contract with a team in Germany, Dinslakener EC of the country’s third tier league. He recorded 70 goals and 59 assists in 38 games for the club. Mitchell then stayed in Germany for the remainder of his professional career, mostly playing for lower league teams. His 14 appearances in the German top-flight Deutsche Eishockey Liga for Krefeld and Hannover came between 1995 and 1997. A proven scorer at the 2. Bundesliga level, he tallied 77 goals and 69 assists for ESC Wedemark during the 1995-96 campaign.

Mitchell finished his professional playing career in 2002.

Coaching and managing career 
As a head coach, Mitchell guided Oberliga team EV Landsberg to promotion to the 2. Bundesliga.

He then spent seven years as head coach of DEL side Augsburger Panther and was the man behind the team’s impressive run to the 2010 DEL finals, the Panthers’ greatest success since winning the 2. Bundesliga championship in 1994. Under his guidance, Augsburg reached the DEL playoffs four times. The Panthers and Mitchell parted ways in December 2014 after a run of bad results.

Only a couple of days later, Mitchell was appointed new head coach of fellow DEL side Straubing Tigers. In the 2015-16 season, he guided the Tigers to the DEL quarterfinals, where they fell short to München, the team that went on to win the championship that year. He parted ways with the Straubing team by mutual consent at the conclusion of the 2016-17 campaign.

On March 28, 2017, Mitchell was named sporting director of DEL club ERC Ingolstadt.

Personal info 
Mitchell was born in Zweibrücken, Germany, where his father, a soldier in the Canadian army, served at the time.

External links 
 http://www.rodi-db.de/player.php?id=2791

References 

Ice hockey coaches
Wedemark Scorpions players
German ice hockey coaches
Krefeld Pinguine players
Cornwall Royals (OHL) players
Canadian ice hockey coaches
German expatriate sportspeople in Switzerland
Canadian expatriate sportspeople in Switzerland